Aquitaine is a French region, consisting of the départements of Dordogne, Gironde, Landes, Lot-et-Garonne and Pyrénées-Atlantiques. The region is known for an annual musical event which takes place in June; during this period, nearly every village and town has a celebration of music and dance. Bordeaux is home to the Bordeaux National Orchestra and the Bordeaux National Ballet Company, both of which contribute to the Bordeaux National Opera and Ballet House. Other music institutions in the region include the Scene Nationale de Bayonne et du Sud Aquitaine, which offers performances and classes.

The folk music of Aquitaine is based on instruments like the hurdy-gurdy, boha, flute, accordion, caremèra and violin.  Traditional players include Alexis Capes, Julien Dejean, Mivielle, Jean Nadau, Lucien Martin, René Cabanac and Pierre Saint-Louber.

Aquitaine
Aquitaine